Tural Yusifov (born 21 August 1981) better known as DJ Tural or DJ Tural Avtostop,  is an Azerbaijani producer, television presenter, DJ and blogger.

Biography 
Tural Yusifov was born on August 21, 1981, in Baku.

Tural Yusifov has been the host of programs such as "Bankomat, "Qatıq", "Svetofor", "Gənc Klub, "Özümə nə gəlib ki, "Talk Şou"

He is the author and host of "Avtostop" project, one of the most listened radio show in Azerbaijan.

From 2021, he is the new face of AccessBank.

Tural Yusifov currently works in ITV and İctimai Radio.

Awards  
 2016 - NETTY National Internet Award 
 2017 - Bomba

References

External links 
 

Living people
1981 births
Azerbaijani television presenters
Azerbaijani radio presenters
Azerbaijani bloggers
Baku State University alumni